Miles Martindale (1756–1824) was an English Wesleyan minister.

Life
The son of Paul Martindale, he was born in 1756 at Moss Bank, near St Helens, Lancashire. He had little education slender education, but was self-taught in French, Latin, and Greek. In 1776 he went to live at Liverpool; the next year he married, and about the same time he became a Methodist.

From 1786 to 1789 Martindale was a local preacher, mainly at Scorton in the Wirral. In 1789 he was received as a Wesleyan minister, and remained in the regular itinerancy 27 years, when he was appointed governor of Woodhouse Grove School, Yorkshire (1816).

Martindale died of cholera on 6 August 1824, while attending the Wesleyan conference at Leeds.

Works
Martindale published, besides sermons:

 'Elegy on the Death of Wesley,' 1791. 
 'Britannia's Glory,' a poem, 1793. 
 'Original Poems, Sacred and Moral,' 1806. 
 'Grace and Nature, a Poem in twenty-four Cantos,' translated from the French of John William Fletcher, 1810. 
 'Dictionary of the Holy Bible,' 1818, 2 vols. 
 'Essay on the Eloquence of the Pulpit,' translated from the French of Joseph-Marie-Anne Gros de Besplas., 1819.

Family
Martindale was married to Margaret King, who died in 1840, and left three daughters: one of whom married John Farrar; another was the wife of the Rev. James Brownell; and the third became matron of Wesley College, Sheffield.

Notes

Attribution

1756 births
1824 deaths
English Methodists
English translators
English male poets
English male non-fiction writers